Elizabeth P. Carpenter is a British structural biologist who is a professor at the Nuffield Department of Medicine in Oxford. She solved the three-dimensional structure of human membrane proteins using X-ray crystallography. Carpenter uses X-ray crystallography to understand the atomic positions within proteins.

Early life and education 
Carpenter studied biochemistry at the University of Cambridge. She moved to Birkbeck, University of London for doctoral research, where she studied biochemistry and crystallography. After completing her doctorate, Carpenter moved to the National Institute for Health Research, which was based at Imperial College London and solved the structures of proteins involved in DNA repair. She also investigated toxoplasmosis and muste movement.

Research and career 
Carpenter is interested in understanding the structure and function of proteins. She studies proteins embedded within cell membranes. The proteins are large hydrophobic surfaces, and understanding their structure is an important step in unravelling the processes of molecules and signals across cell membranes. She established the Membrane Protein Laboratory at the Diamond Light Source in 2007. In 2009, she moved to the Structural Genomics Consortium at the University of Oxford.

Carpenter was the first to describe the structure of the human ABC-transporter ABC10. ABC10 is a mitrochonridal protein that is important in the production of heme. She has studied premature ageing syndromes that are caused by failure of the lamin proteins, and the role of the metalloprotease ZMPSTE24. She has also studied human ion channels, including TREK-2, a K2P protein that gives rise to the background leak current that contributes to membrane potential.

Selected publications

References 

Living people
Alumni of the University of Cambridge
Alumni of Birkbeck, University of London
English biologists
Year of birth missing (living people)